Dismal Buttress is a mainly ice-free rock bluff, overlooking the west side of the head of Shackleton Glacier about  northwest of Roberts Massif. It was so named because of several depressing incidents experienced here by the Southern Party of the New Zealand Geological Survey Antarctic Expedition (1961–62), including the loss of Dismal, the party's only lead dog, which had to be destroyed.

References 

Cliffs of the Ross Dependency
Dufek Coast